Sebastião Loureiro da Silva (born 22 April 1925) is a Portuguese former footballer who played as goalkeeper.

See also
Football in Portugal
List of football clubs in Portugal

References

External links 
 
 

1925 births
Possibly living people
Portuguese footballers
Association football goalkeepers
Primeira Liga players
G.D. Estoril Praia players
Portugal international footballers